NDRI may refer to:

 Norepinephrine-dopamine reuptake inhibitor
 National Dairy Research Institute, India
 National Development and Research Institute, United States, researched various public health and social matters
 National Disease Research Interchange, United States, distributes human tissues etc. for scientific research